Allison Ivy Shearmur (also known as Alli Shearmur; née Brecker; October 23, 1963 – January 19, 2018) was an American film executive and producer. Working for companies including Walt Disney Studios, Universal Pictures, Paramount Pictures and Lionsgate, her production work involved such films as the American Pie and Jason Bourne franchises, The Hunger Games films, the live-action remake of Cinderella, as well as the Star Wars anthology films Rogue One and Solo.

Career
Shearmur attended the University of Pennsylvania Law School and the USC Gould School of Law, becoming a member of the State Bar of California. While at university, she entered a campus contest and won first prize, lunch with Stanley Jaffe, an executive at Columbia Pictures. Jaffe became a lifelong mentor and role model for Shearmur.

After graduation, Shearmur was hired from a young executive management initiative as a manager in the comedy development department at Columbia TriStar. She worked at Disney as a vice-president between 1994 and 1997, including movies such as George of the Jungle. She then joined Universal as an executive vice-president of production, and worked on Along Came Polly, Erin Brockovich and the American Pie and Bourne series.

Shearmur also worked for two years at Paramount as co-president of production, where she was responsible for the studio's literary productions such as The Curious Case of Benjamin Button, The Spiderwick Chronicles, Stop-Loss, Zodiac, Dreamgirls, Charlotte's Web, Nacho Libre, and Failure to Launch. In 2008, she moved to Lionsgate as president of motion picture production. While at Lionsgate she produced the first two Hunger Games movies, then executive produced the final two.

Shearmur formed her own production company, Allison Shearmur Productions. In 2017, her company executive produced the television movie Dirty Dancing.

Personal life
Shearmur was born a quadruplet to Martin and Rhoda Brecker, and grew up in a traditional Jewish household. She married film composer Edward Shearmur, with whom she had two children. In 2014, the Shearmurs had a house featured in House Beautiful.

Allison Shearmur died of lung cancer on January 19, 2018, at Ronald Reagan UCLA Medical Center in Los Angeles. She was 54. The films Solo: A Star Wars Story, The One and Only Ivan and Chaos Walking were dedicated to her memory.

Filmography

References

External links
 

1963 births
2018 deaths
American film production company founders
American women company founders
American company founders
American women film producers
University of Pennsylvania Law School alumni
USC Gould School of Law alumni
California lawyers
American people of Belarusian-Jewish descent
Jewish film people
Deaths from lung cancer in California
20th-century American lawyers
20th-century American women
21st-century American women